Wilhem Walter Rudolph Max Seelmann-Eggebert (17 April 1915 – 19 July 1988) was a German radiochemist. He was son of Erich Eggebert and Edwig Schmidt.

He was a student of Otto Hahn at the Kaiser Wilhelm Institute for Chemistry, where, after 1939, he worked with Fritz Strassmann on nuclear fission.

In 1949, he joined the University of Tucuman in Argentina as a professor of chemistry. Later he created the radiochemistry group at the Buenos Aires University and at the National Atomic Energy Commission, working together with other notable pioneers of radiochemistry, such as Sara Abecasis, Gregorio Baro, Juan Flegenheimer, Jaime Pahissa-Campá, María Cristina Palcos, Enzo Ricci, Renato Radicella, Plinio Rey, Josefina Rodríguez, and Maela Viirsoo, just to mention a few. During his Argentinian years his group discovered 20 new nuclides.

In 1955, Otto Hahn invited him to come back to Germany for the reconstruction of radiochemistry studies in the country. He became professor in Mainz before creating and managing the Radiochemistry Institute from the Karlsruhe Kernforschungszentrum, now the Karlsruhe Institute of Technology (KIT).
In 1958, together with Gerda Pfennig, he edited the first "Karlsruher Nuklidkarte" which has become a basic element both for nuclear scientists and education.

External links
KIT
 FLEGENHEIMER, J. (2014). The mystery of the disappearing isotope. Revista Virtual de Química, V. XX. Available at http://www.uff.br/RVQ/index.php/rvq/article/viewFile/660/450

20th-century German chemists
Radiochemistry
1915 births
1988 deaths